Salvador Suárez (born 14 January 1948) is a Mexican equestrian. He competed in two events at the 1984 Summer Olympics.

References

1948 births
Living people
Mexican male equestrians
Olympic equestrians of Mexico
Equestrians at the 1984 Summer Olympics
Place of birth missing (living people)